The temple of Maa Sheetla Chaukiya Devi is quite old. The worship of Shiva and Shakti happens here.

History
During the era of Hindu kings, the governance of Jaunpur was in the hands of Ahir rulers. Heerchand Yadav is considered the first Aheer ruler of Jaunpur. The descendants of this clan used to surname 'Ahir'. These people built forts at Chandvak and Gopalpur. It is believed that the temple of Chaukiya Devi was built in the glory of their clan-deity either by the Yadavs or the Bhars- but in view of the predilections of the Bhars, it seems more logical to conclude that this temple was built by the Bhars. The Bhars were non-Aryans. The worship of Shiv and Shakti was prevalent in the non-Armyans. The Bhars held power in Jaunpur. At first, the Devi must have been installed on a praised platform or 'chaukiya' and probably because of this she was referred to as Chaukia Devi. Devu Sheetla is the representative blissful aspect of the Divine Mother: hence she was called Sheetla. On Mondays and Fridays, worshippers come here in quite large numbers. Huge crowds gather here during the Navratris.

Folklore about Devi 
One story says Goddess Durga has incarnated as little Katyayani, the daughter of sage Katyayan to destroy all arrogant evil demonic forces of the world, in her real form as Durga, she killed many demons that were sent by Kaalkeya.

A demon named Jvarasura, the demon of fever, started spreading incurable diseases to Katyayani's childhood friends, such as cholera, dysentery, measles, smallpox etc. Katyayani cured the diseases of some of her friends. To relieve the world from all fevers and diseases, Katyayani assumed the form of Shitala Devi. Each of her four hands held a short broom, winnowing fan, jar of cooling water and a drinking cup. With her power, she cured all the children's diseases. Katyayani then requests her friend, Batuk to go out and confront the demon Jwarasur. A battle ensued between the young Batuk and demon Jwarasur. Jwarasur succeeds in defeating Batuk. Then, Batuk, lying dead, magically faded into dust. Jwarasur was shocked that Batuk disappeared and wondered where he went. Then, what he doesn't know that Batuk has assumed the form of an awful male figure. This person was three-eyed and had four arms. He held a battle-axe, sword, trident and demon head. He was pitch-black in color. His hair was flowing. Eyes blazed with fury. This figure wore a tiger-skin and a garland of skulls. Batuk assumed the form of Lord Shiva's ferocious form, the terrible Bhairav. Bhairav reprimands Jwarasur and tells him that he is the servant of Goddess Durga (incarnate as Katyayani). A long discussion ensued but then converted into battle. Jwarasur created many demons from his powers but Bhairav managed to destroy all of them. Finally, Bhairav wrestled with Jwarasur and killed him with his trident.

Location
Chaukiya Dham Situated Near Prasad group of Institution(SH-36).Nearest Railway Station is Jaunpur Junction & Yadavendranagar Halt.

4 Km from Jaunpur Junction
& 1.5 Km from Yadvendranagar.

External links

Buildings and structures in Jaunpur, Uttar Pradesh
Hindu temples in Uttar Pradesh
Shakti temples